Protjapyx is a genus of diplurans in the family Japygidae.

Species
 Protjapyx major (Grassi, 1886)

References

Diplura